Maria Wilhelmina Wandscheer, known as Marie (1856 – 1936) was a Dutch painter; primarily of female portraits and flowers.

Biography
She was born to Johan Frederik Christiaan Wandscheer, the Director of a shipping line, and his wife, Anna Christina née Pilger. She never married.

Her first painting lessons were provided by Valentijn Bing, then she studied with August Allebé, for ten years, at the Rijksakademie van beeldende kunsten.

From 1892 to 1895, she lived in Nieuwer-Amstel, then moved to Ede, where she would live for the rest of her life. There, she befriended the painter and etcher, Willem Witsen, who gave her further lessons. She was also a close friend of Lizzy Ansingh, one of the Amsterdamse Joffers, a group with which she became associated. In addition to her oil paintings, she created pastels and etchings.

Her professional memberships included Arti et Amicitiae and the Pulchri Studio. She held several exhibitions, in Amsterdam, The Hague, Rotterdam, and Ede. She also exhibited with the  society in Renkum.

Gallery

References

External links

 More works by Wandscheer @ ArtNet

1856 births
1936 deaths
Dutch women painters
Painters from Amsterdam